This is a list of scientists who participated in the 1964 Evolving Genes and Proteins symposium, a landmark event in the history of molecular evolution.  The symposium, supported by the National Science Foundation, took place on September 17 and September 18, 1964 at the Institute of Microbiology of Rutgers University.  A summary of the proceedings was published in Science, and the full proceedings were edited by Vernon Bryson and Henry J. Vogel and published in 1965.

References

Biology-related lists
Evolution
History of evolutionary biology